Chiridota heheva is a species of sea cucumber in the family Chiridotidae. The species is found in the Western Atlantic Ocean, in deeper regions and cold seeps. It was described by Pawson and Vance in 2004.

References 
 

Chiridotidae
Animals described in 2004